{{Infobox college
|name         = Talimuddin Inter College
|native_name  = 
|image_name   = Talimuddin Inter College front.jpg
|image_size   = 
|caption      = 
|latin_name   = 
|motto        =  allama'l-insāna mā lam ya'lam''
|motto_lang   = ar
|mottoeng     = Taught man what he knew not. (Qur'an 96:5)
|established  = 1966
|type         = Minority
|staff        = 
|president    = 
|provost      = 
|rector       = 
|chancellor   = 
|principal    = Mohammad Mazhar
|dean         = 
|head_label   = 
|head         = 
|students     = 6000
|undergrad    = 
|postgrad     = 
|doctoral     = 
|faculty      = 
|language     = Hindi
|city         = Mau
|state        = Uttar Pradesh
|country      = India
|campus       = 
|free_label   = 
|free         = 
|colors       = 
|colours      = 
|mascot       = 
|Anthem       = 
|nickname     = TIC
|affiliations = 
|coor         = 
|logo         = 
}}Taimuddin Inter College (TIC''') is a minority college, funded in 1966 as Junior High School in Khiri Bagh, Mau and affiliated to the Board of High School and Intermediate Education Uttar Pradesh.

There are four branches of the school.
 Talimuddin Inter College ( For Boys (Classes 6-12)
 Talimuddin Girls Inter College ( For Girls (Classes 6-12))
 Talimuddin Niswan Degree College (For Girls (Graduation / Post-Graduation)
 Madarsa Talimuddin (KG-Upper class)

History

Principals
Shamim Khan - (1 July 1966 – 31 June 1997)
Neyaz Ahmad - (1 July 1997 – 21 November 2013)
Neyaz Ansari - (21 November 2013 – 30 June 2014)
Mohammad Shahid - (1 July 2014 – July 2015)
Mohammad Mazhar - (September 2015 – present)

External links
Uttar Pradesh Madhyamik Shiksha Parishad (Uttar Pradesh Board of High School and Intermediate Education) webpage
https://talimuddingirlsintercollege.com/ (Website for Girls Section)

Intermediate colleges in Uttar Pradesh
Mau
Educational institutions established in 1966
1966 establishments in Uttar Pradesh